The 2009 Triple J's Hottest 100 Volume 17, was announced on Australia Day 26 January 2010. It is the seventeenth countdown of the most popular songs of the year, as chosen by the listeners of Australian radio station Triple J.

Voting commenced on Boxing Day, 26 December 2009, and closed on 17 January 2010. 1.1 million votes were received, a record number.

Controversy began when it was rumoured that the winner had been unintentionally leaked by the ABC. The ABC Shop website promoted the February issue of Jmag with a description stating "Topping the 2009 countdown is Mumford & Sons' 'Little Lion Man'". Triple J neither confirmed nor denied the rumour with some even claiming it was a hoax, amounting to a clever marketing campaign. The leak led Sportingbet Australia to close all betting on the countdown. The leak proved to be accurate. For the first time, the number one song was performed live on air by the winning artist, Mumford & Sons, from Triple J studios, followed by the studio version of the song.

Full list
Note: Australian artists 

 101 was "(Ain't) Telling the Truth" by Bluejuice.

Artists with multiple entries
Four entries
 Muse (9, 19, 35, 84)
 Florence and the Machine (10, 44, 45, 90)
Three entries
 Kasabian (17, 51, 85)
 The Temper Trap (21, 48, 58)
 Flight of the Conchords (24, 30, 86)
 Sia (Two solo and one with Flight of the Conchords) (24, 50, 72)
Two entries
 Mumford & Sons (1, 81)
 Art vs. Science (2, 74)
 Hilltop Hoods (3, 37)
 Phoenix (4, 13)
 La Roux (6, 27)
 Lily Allen (8, 60)
 Yeah Yeah Yeahs (11, 25)
 Dizzee Rascal (12, 80)
 Passion Pit (20, 38)
 Vampire Weekend (22, 52)
 The Bloody Beetroots (23, 43)
 Sarah Blasko (28, 29)
 Karnivool (47, 63)
 Bertie Blackman (71, 93)
 The Middle East (64, 87)
 Regina Spektor (94, 97)
 Dave Grohl (Once with Them Crooked Vultures and once with the Foo Fighters) (98, 100)

Countries represented
 Australia: 37
 United Kingdom: 29
 United States: 23
 Canada: 4
 New Zealand: 3
 France: 2
 Italy: 2
 Sweden: 1

The 37 Australian songs is the fewest since 1997.

This was the first year to not feature an artist from USA in the top 10.

Top 20 Albums of 2009
Bold indicates winner. Sarah Blasko won the J Award for As Day Follows Night.

Nations represented
 Australia – 7
 United Kingdom – 7
 United States – 4
 Canada – 1
 France – 1

CD release
Triple J's Hottest 100 Volume 17 is the compilation featuring the best of the Top 100 voted tracks on two CDs.

Notes

References
Official list from abc.net.au

2009 in Australian music
Australia Triple J Hottest 100
2009